The Inter-Provincial Trophy is a Twenty20 cricket tournament between the four leading cricketing provinces of Ireland. The tournament was first held by three provinces in 2013, across venues in both Northern Ireland and the Republic of Ireland. A fourth province, Munster Reds was added in 2017.

History

Background

The Ireland cricket team have had huge success recently on the international level which has boosted the popularity of the game in the country. They had earned the reputation of a giant killer after upsetting teams like Pakistan and Bangladesh (2007 Cricket World Cup), and England (2011 Cricket World Cup). Their good performances in major international tournaments meant that Cricket Ireland openly started bidding for Test match status to the International Cricket Council. Nevertheless, one of the main stumbling road blocks for Ireland from getting to play the pinnacle of the game was a lack of a first-class cricket infrastructure at home, among other things. As early as August 2011, Cricket Ireland announced plans of a domestic first-class tournament. In January 2012, Cricket Ireland announced the ambitious 'Vision 2020' plan which announced the establishment of a first-class structure by 2015 and achievement of Test status by 2020. It also began work on a cricket academy to find talented players across the country and improving grass-roots cricket in the country. For the first time professional contacts, with central, A, B, and C were established. Plans for Test status were established partly to stem the flow of their star cricketers moving away to England in hope of playing Test cricket such as Ed Joyce, Eoin Morgan and Boyd Rankin. According to Richard Holdsworth in an interview with Setanta Sports, CI are pleased with the strategic progress that had been made as of November 2012. In December 2012, Ireland got a $1.5m boost as increased funding from the ICC to establish elite domestic competitions in the country.

Format
The tournament is held as a double round-robin format with each team playing each other twice, once at its home ground and the other leg away.

Teams
According to Richard Holsworth's interview to Setanta Sports, three teams would initially participate in the tournament, Leinster, Northern and North West, representing the three historically strongest provincial unions in Irish cricket, as Munster and Connacht Unions were considered still quite far away from fielding a competitive team for provincial tournaments. 

They were also given a separate limited overs brands or names familiar to supporters of the systems in England and Australia, Leinster Lightning, Northern Knights and North West Warriors. Munster were added for the 2017 season, choosing to play under the name Munster Reds.

Competition placings

2013 to present
Results of each season are here:

All-time records
(Correct to 3 August 2014)

Team records

Highest innings totals

Lowest completed innings totals

Individual records - batting

Most career runs

Highest individual scores

Most runs scored in a season

Individual records - bowling

Most career wickets

Best bowling in an innings

Most wickets in a season

Partnership records

Highest partnerships for each wicket

Seasons
2013 Inter-Provincial Trophy
2014 Inter-Provincial Trophy

See also

Cricket in Ireland
History of cricket
Inter-Provincial Championship
Inter-Provincial Cup

References and notes

Irish domestic cricket competitions
Twenty20 cricket leagues
Professional cricket leagues
Inter-Provincial Trophy